Pınar Deniz (born 4 November 1993) is a Turkish actress. She is best known for her roles in Wounded Love (2016–2018), Love 101 (2020–2021) and The Judgement (2021–present). Deniz earned a Turkish Film Critics Association Award nomination for her performance in Two Types of People (2020). In 2022, She won the Golden Butterfly Award for Best Actress for her role in The Judgement.

Early life and career 
Pınar Deniz was born on 4 November 1993 in Adana. Her family is of Lebanese descent. Her family is the one of Arab families in antique multicultural city Mardin. She stated that she could speak Arabic with Mardin dialect as a child, but now she has forgotten Arabic. She moved with her family to Tarabya, Istanbul, where she grew up. She graduated from the Istanbul University School of Public Relations and Advertising. She lost her maternal grandmother during the COVID-19 pandemic in Turkey. 

She made her television debut in 2014 with the high school series Sil Baştan, in which she portrayed the character of Evrim. She later appeared in a music video for Murat Dalkılıç's song, "Yani". Her breakthrough came with the popular TV series Vatanım Sensin, in which she had the role of Yıldız. As of 2021, she shares the leading roles with Kaan Urgancıoğlu in the TV series Yargı, with whom she had previously co-starred in the Netflix original series Aşk 101.

Filmography

Film

Web

Television

Awards and nominations

References

External links
 

1994 births
Turkish television actresses
Turkish film actresses
Living people
Turkish people of Lebanese descent
Istanbul University alumni
People from Adana